Cook Group Incorporated is an American privately held company based in Bloomington, Indiana, and primarily involved in manufacturing of medical devices. It was ranked #324 in Forbes' 2008 America's Largest Private Companies. It has four main divisions: Cook Medical, Cook Services, Cook Properties, and Cook Brothers Insulation. All four divisions are made up of several subsidiary companies.

The flagship company, Cook Incorporated, part of the medical division, was founded in 1963 in a spare bedroom in Bloomington. The first products of Cook Incorporated included catheters, needles, and wire guides. Today, the company manufactures more than 16,000 products across 10 hospital service lines, and serves 135 countries. Other companies include also the manufacturers K-Tube and Cook Polymer Technology. Cook owns CFC Properties, a property development company that owns residential and commercial properties in Bloomington as well as Fountain Square Mall and Grant Street Inn. Cook also restored and owns the French Lick Resort, which includes the historic West Baden Springs Hotel and the French Lick Springs Hotel.

Subsidiaries

Medical manufacturing

 Cook Incorporated
 Cook Research Incorporated
 Cook Urological Incorporated
 Cook MyoSite
 Cook Brothers Insulation
 MED Institute, Inc.
 Cook Biotech Incorporated
 Cook Endoscopy
 Cook Vascular Incorporated
 William Cook Europe ApS
 William A. Cook Australia Pty. Ltd.
 Cook Ireland Ltd.

Allied manufacturing
 Sabin Corporation now Cook Polymer Technology
 K-Tube Corporation

Affiliates
 CFC, Inc.
 Fountain Square Mall
 Grant Street Inn
 Cook Aviation Inc.
 Cook Travel
 Cook Family Health Center Inc.

Subsidiary acquisition: Cook Pharmica LLC
In September 2017, Catalent purchased Cook Pharmica for $950 million.

References

External links 
 Cook Group — official home page
 Cook Medical — official home page; most Cook content
 Cook Group Businesses — with links to subsidiaries

Medical technology companies of the United States
American companies established in 1963
Manufacturing companies established in 1963
Health care companies established in 1963
Manufacturing companies based in Indiana
Health care companies based in Indiana
Privately held companies based in Indiana
Companies based in Bloomington, Indiana
American brands